Tomáš Mažár (born June 1, 1980) is a Slovak handball player, currently playing for HT Tatran Prešov in the Slovak Extraliga. He also played in UHC Gänserndorf, MSK SIRS Povazska Bystrica and HC Trnava.

See also
Sport in Slovakia

References

External links
Tomas Mažar profile

Slovak male handball players
Living people
1980 births
Place of birth missing (living people)